The Central Library is a three-story public library branch in downtown Portland, Oregon, United States. Opened in 1913, it serves as the main branch of the Multnomah County Library system. In 1979, the Georgian style building was added to the National Register of Historic Places as the Central Building, Public Library. The library underwent major structural and interior renovations in the mid 1990s.

History

The Library Association of Portland was formed in 1864. After going through several locations during the first half-century of existence, the library board decided on a new large main branch for downtown Portland in 1911. The building was designed by architect A. E. Doyle, and opened on September 6, 1913. It was one of the first libraries in the United States to feature an open plan design of the interior. Construction on the building lasted for two years and cost $480,000 to complete. Librarian Mary Frances Isom provided input on the design.

The Central Library was listed on the National Register of Historic Places as the Central Building, Public Library on June 11, 1979. On July 1, 1990, the private Library Association of Portland officially transferred ownership of the library to Multnomah County. From 1902 until that date, the association owned the collections and buildings, but the operations were paid for by the local governments. From 1994 to 1997, the entire roof of the building was removed and completely rebuilt, while the interior was partially gutted and extensively restored and renovated. During the remodel, the library collection was moved to the nearby Fifth Avenue Building (the former State Office Building). Library patrons still had access to the collection during the renovation.

Details
Architecturally, the building was designed in the Georgian style. The main staircase at the library has a total of 92 steps. Artwork at the location includes  the "Tree of Knowledge" by Dana Louis. The exterior walls are covered with Wilkinson Sandstone. Interior details include extensive use of marble and wood. The branch contains  of space spread over the three floors.

The branch is home to the Beverly Cleary Children's Library and the Henry Failing Art and Music Library. Other features include the Sterling Room for Writers, the Collins Gallery on the third floor, and the John Wilson Room. The first floor houses the U.S. Bank Room, a small conference room available for public use. The library's collections weigh more than 875 tons and take up  of shelf space. A total of 130 computer terminals are available to the public.

References

Further reading

External links

 "Central Library (Multnomah County Library)" in The Oregon Encyclopedia
 Central Library History from Multnomah County Library
Official site
Emporis listing
Central Library: 100 years in photos

Library buildings completed in 1913
Libraries in Portland, Oregon
Multnomah County Library
National Register of Historic Places in Portland, Oregon
1913 establishments in Oregon
A. E. Doyle buildings
Libraries established in 1913
Libraries on the National Register of Historic Places in Oregon
Southwest Portland, Oregon
Portland Historic Landmarks